Rene Lopez Relampagos (born December 28, 1963) is a Filipino politician. He is a former vice-governor of the Province of Bohol after having been elected in the local elections as part of the 2019 Philippine General Election and ending his term on June 30, 2022. He has also served three terms as a member of the House of Representatives of the Philippines representing the 1st congressional district of the Province of Bohol.

Biography and career
Rene Lopez Relampagos was born on December 28, 1963, in Tagbilaran City, Bohol, Philippines. He is the son of the former Loon, Bohol  mayor Juan "Aning" M. Relampagos and Esperanza "Nene" Lopez Relampagos.

Political career

He started his political career as Technical Consultant for Youth and Sports Development of the Bohol Provincial Government from 1988 to 1989. He then became board member of the Province of Bohol from 1989 to 1992. In 1992, he was elected as Vice Governor of the Provincial Government of Bohol and served until 1995. He served as Governor of the province of Bohol from 1995 to 2001. In the local elections as part of the 2010 Philippine General Election, he ran and won as a member of the House of Representatives as representative of the first district of Bohol. He continued to win his re-election bids for 2013 and 2016 respectively, allowing him to serve a full three terms as the 1st District Representative of the Province of Bohol. During the 2019 Philippine General Election, he ran for the position of Vice-Governor of Bohol and won after securing 317,318 votes against his opponent's 277,933 votes.

Committee membership

 Chairman, Committee on Human Rights
 Vice Chairman, Committee on Information and Communications Technology
 Member, Committee on Accounts
 Member, Committee on Transportation
 Member, Committee on Tourism
 Member, Committee on Higher and Technical Education
 Member, Congressional Oversight Committee on Biofuels

Awards

 Top Province in Assessment Efficiency – Region VII (1988)
 Regional Silver Award, Most Outstanding Province in Local Budget Administration (1997 and 1998)
 Website of the Year (Government Category, Philippine Webby Awards) – 1999
 Galing Pook Award and Cash Prize: Cultural Renaissance Program (Galing Pook Foundation, AIM, Ford Foundation) – 2000
 Galing Pook Award: Bohol Investment Promotion Program (Galing Pook Foundation, AIM, Ford Foundation) – 2000
 Outstanding Library of the Philippines (The National Library) – 2000
 Guhit Award for Cultural Heritage (for the Diocese of Tagbilaran and the Province of Bohol given by Design and Architecture Magazine) – 2000
 Best Performing Peace and Order Council – Region VII (DILG) – 2000
 Best Performing LGU-Province Category (PADAC) Anti-Illegal Drugs Campaign – Region VII (DILG)-2000
 Cash Award for Attaining the Program Benchmarks for CY2001 Ahead of Schedule under the LGU Performance Program (LPP) on Health (DOH/USAID) – 2000
 Most Outstanding Province: Philippine Plan of Action and Nutrition – Region VII (CSC) – 2000
 Province with the Highest Number of Participating Municipalities Nationwide in its Real Property Data Computerization Program under MDP III (BLDGF-DOF) – 2000
 Most Outstanding Travel Mart Exhibitor – Visayas Travel Mart (DOT and Cebu Chamber of Commerce and Industry) – 2000
 Presidential Awardee, Cleanest and Greenest Province – 1999
 Outstanding Province in Real Property Tax Collection – Region VII (BLGF-DOF) – 1999
 Outstanding Provincial Disaster and Coordinating Council – Region VII (DILG) – 1999

References

1963 births
Living people
Governors of Bohol
Members of the House of Representatives of the Philippines from Bohol
Members of the Bohol Provincial Board
Ateneo de Manila University alumni
People from Tagbilaran
Boholano people